From January 21 to June 3, 1980, voters of the Republican Party chose its nominee for president in the 1980 United States presidential election. Retired Hollywood actor and two-term California governor Ronald Reagan was selected as the nominee through a series of primary elections and caucuses culminating in the Republican National Convention held from July 14 to July 17, 1980, in Detroit, Michigan.

Background
As the 1980 presidential election approached, incumbent Democratic president Jimmy Carter appeared vulnerable. High gas prices, economic stagflation, a renewed Cold War with the Soviet Union following the invasion of Afghanistan, and the Iran hostage crisis that developed when Iranian students seized the American embassy in Tehran all contributed to a general dissatisfaction with Carter's presidency; his job approval rating sank to below 20 percent in late-1979 as a result. Consequently, the president faced stiff Democratic primary challenges from Massachusetts Senator Ted Kennedy and California Governor Jerry Brown. A large field of Republican challengers also emerged.

Candidates

Nominee

Withdrew during primaries

Withdrew before primaries

Declined to run
The following potential candidates declined to run for the Republican nomination in 1980.

 Frank Borman, former astronaut from Indiana and Chief Executive Officer of Eastern Air Lines
 Bill Brock, RNC Chairman of Tennessee; former Senator from Tennessee
 John Danforth, Senator from Missouri
 Pete du Pont, Governor of Delaware
 Gerald Ford, former President of the United States
 Spiro Agnew, former Vice President of the United States
 Jesse Helms, Senator from North Carolina
 Jack Kemp, U.S. Representative from New York
 Alexander Haig, former NATO Commander
 John Heinz, Senator from Pennsylvania
 Charles Mathias, Senator from Maryland
 Charles Percy, Senator from Illinois
 Elliot Richardson, former United States Secretary of Commerce
 William Ruckelshaus, former Director of the Federal Bureau of Investigation
 Richard Schweiker, Senator from Pennsylvania
 Bill Simon, former United States Secretary of the Treasury (endorsed Reagan)
 Jim Thompson, Governor of Illinois

Polling

National polling

Primary race 

Ronald Reagan, who had narrowly lost the 1976 Republican nomination to President Gerald Ford, was the early odds-on favorite to win the nomination in 1980. He was so far ahead in the polls that campaign director John Sears decided on an "above the fray" strategy. He did not attend many of the multi-candidate forums and straw polls in the summer and fall of 1979.

George H. W. Bush, the former director of the Central Intelligence Agency and chairman of the Republican National Committee, did go to all the so-called "cattle calls", and began to come in first at a number of these events. Along with the top two, a number of other Republican politicians entered the race.

In January 1980, the Iowa Republicans decided to have a straw poll as a part of their caucuses for that year. Bush defeated Reagan by a small margin. Bush declared he had "the Big Mo", and with Reagan boycotting the Puerto Rico primary in deference to New Hampshire, Bush won the territory easily, giving him an early lead going into New Hampshire.

With the other candidates in single digits, the Nashua Telegraph offered to host a debate between Reagan and Bush. Worried that a newspaper-sponsored debate might violate electoral regulations, Reagan subsequently arranged to fund the event with his own campaign money, inviting the other candidates to participate at short notice. The Bush camp did not learn of Reagan's decision to include the other candidates until the debate was due to commence. Bush refused to participate, which led to an impasse on the stage. As Reagan attempted to explain his decision, the editor of the Nashua Telegraph ordered the sound man to mute Reagan's microphone. A visibly angry Reagan responded, "I am paying for this microphone, Mr.  (referring to the editor Jon Breen). Eventually the other candidates agreed to leave, and the debate proceeded between Reagan and Bush. Reagan's quote was often repeated as "I paid for this microphone!" and dominated news coverage of the event; Reagan sailed to an easy win in New Hampshire.

Lee Bandy, a writer for the South Carolina newspaper The State stated that heading into the South Carolina primary, political operative Lee Atwater worked to engineer a victory for Reagan: "Lee Atwater figured that Connally was their biggest threat here in South Carolina. So Lee leaked a story to me that John Connally was trying to buy the black vote. Well, that story got out, thanks to me, and it probably killed Connally. He spent $10 million for one delegate. Lee saved Ronald Reagan's candidacy."

Reagan swept the South, and although he lost five more primaries to Bush—including the Massachusetts primary in which he came in third place behind John B. Anderson—the former governor had a lock on the nomination very early in the season. Reagan said he would always be grateful to the people of Iowa for giving him "the kick in the pants" he needed.

Reagan was an adherent to a policy known as supply-side economics, which argues that economic growth can be most effectively created using incentives for people to produce (supply) goods and services, such as adjusting income tax and capital gains tax rates. Accordingly, Reagan promised an economic revival that would benefit all sectors of the population. He said that cutting tax rates would actually increase tax revenues because the lower rates would cause people to work harder as they would be able to keep more of their money. Reagan also called for a drastic cut in "big government" and pledged to deliver a balanced budget for the first time since 1969. In the primaries Bush called Reagan's economic policy "voodoo economics" because it promised to lower taxes and increase revenues at the same time.

Results

Statewide

Nationwide
Primaries, total popular vote:
 Ronald Reagan – 7,709,793 (59.79%)
 George H. W. Bush – 3,070,033 (23.81%)
 John B. Anderson – 1,572,174 (12.19%)
 Howard Baker – 181,153 (1.41%)
 Phil Crane – 97,793 (0.76%)
 John B. Connally – 82,625 (0.64%)
 Unpledged – 68,155 (0.53%)
 Ben Fernandez – 25,520 (0.20%)
 Harold Stassen – 25,425 (0.20%)
 Gerald Ford – 10,557 (0.08%)
 Bob Dole – 7,204 (0.06%)

The Republican National Convention was held in Detroit, Michigan, from July 14 to July 17, 1980.

Endorsements
 Ronald Reagan 
 New Hampshire Union Leader of Manchester, New Hampshire
 Former Governor Deane C. Davis of Vermont
 Senator Bob Dole of Kansas (former candidate)
 State Senator and former Representative Donald "Buz" Lukens of Ohio
 Representative Thomas N. Kindness of Ohio

 John B. Connally, Jr. 
 Senator Strom Thurmond of South Carolina
 Governor Bill Clements of Texas
 Senator Henry Bellmon of Oklahoma
 Former Senator Clifford Hansen of Wyoming
 Former Governor Tim Babcock of Montana
 Mayor Buddy Cianci of Providence, Rhode Island
 Former U.S. Postmaster General Winton M. Blount of Alabama
 Former U.S. Attorney General Herbert Brownell of New York
 Former RNC Chair Leonard Hall of New York
 Former NY Attorney General Louis J. Lefkowitz of New York
 Retired Admiral Thomas Hinman Moorer, former Chairman of the Joint Chiefs of Staff, of Maryland
 NASCAR driver Richard Petty of North Carolina

 George H.W. Bush 
 Former State Representative Francis W. Hatch Jr. of Massachusetts
 Former United States Attorney General and Commerce Secretary Elliot Richardson of Massachusetts
 Former Senator, Ambassador and 1960 Republican Vice-Presidential nominee Henry Cabot Lodge Jr. of Massachusetts
 Former Senator Robert Taft Jr. of Ohio
 Former Senator and U.S. Attorney General William Saxbe of Ohio

 John B. Anderson 
 Middlesex County Sheriff John J. Buckley of Massachusetts
 State Representative Paul Cellucci of Massachusetts
 Former Senator Edward Brooke of Massachusetts
 Representative Jim Jeffords of Vermont
 Representative Pete McCloskey of California
 Representative Paul Findley 
 Representative David F. Emery 
 The Hutchinson News of Hutchinson, Kansas

 Howard Baker 
 Former Governor Walter R. Peterson Jr. of New Hampshire
 State Attorney General Thomas D. Rath
 Former Representative Perkins Bass
 Senator William Cohen 
 Governor Richard A. Snelling of Vermont

 Phil Crane 
 Rev. Joe Morecraft III of Cumming, Georgia

See also

1980 Democratic Party presidential primaries

Notes

References

 
Ronald Reagan
George H. W. Bush